Thomas Ingilby is the name of:
Sir Thomas Ingilby (c. 1290-1352), acquired Ripley Castle by marriage
Sir Thomas Ingilby (1310–1369), of Ripley Castle, knighted after saving king
Sir Thomas Colvin William Ingilby, 6th Baronet (born 1955)